Jill Andrew  is a Canadian politician who has represented Toronto—St. Paul's in the Legislative Assembly of Ontario since June 7, 2018 as a member of the Ontario New Democratic Party (NDP).

Education 
Andrew attended Humber College, where she earned a child and youth worker diploma. She also holds a Bachelor of Education (BEd) from York University amongst her other undergraduate degrees, a master’s degree from the University of Toronto in women and gender studies, a PhD from the York University Faculty of Education.

Political career 
Andrew ran as the NDP candidate in Toronto—St. Paul's in the 2018 provincial election and was elected as a member of Provincial Parliament (MPP). She is the critic for culture and women's issues. She is part of the Ontario NDP Black caucus, along with fellow MPPs Laura Mae Lindo, Faisal Hassan, Rima Berns-McGown and Kevin Yarde. She is the first Black and Queer person to be elected to the Ontario Legislature.

Andrew has served as official opposition critic on a number of portfolios, including women's issues, culture and heritage. Andrew has passed several pieces of legislation, including Bill 61 which proclaims the week beginning February 1 in each year as Eating Disorders Awareness Week. Bill 61 received Royal Assent in December 2020.

Personal life
Andrew identifies as queer. Andrew and her partner Aisha Fairclough, a television producer and diversity consultant, are members of the community consortium that own Glad Day Bookshop, an LGBT bookstore in Toronto's Church and Wellesley gay village. Andrew cofounded the group Body Confidence Canada.

Electoral record

References

External links
 Official website
 Parliamentary history

Living people
21st-century Canadian politicians
21st-century Canadian women politicians
Activists from Toronto
Black Canadian politicians
Black Canadian women
Businesspeople from Toronto
Canadian LGBT people in provincial and territorial legislatures
Ontario New Democratic Party MPPs
Politicians from Toronto
Women MPPs in Ontario
Black Canadian LGBT people
Queer women
Black Canadian activists
Year of birth missing (living people)
21st-century Canadian LGBT people